John Penrose (born 1964) is the British Conservative Member of Parliament (MP) for Weston-super-Mare.
 
John Penrose may also refer to:

John Penrose (MP for Liskeard), in 1411, MP for Liskeard (parliamentary borough)
John Penrose (Parliamentarian) (born 1611), English politician
John Penrose (priest) (1778–1859), clergyman and theological writer
John Penrose (archer) (1850–1932), British Olympic archer
John Penrose (actor) (1914–1983), British actor
John Penrose (journalist), British journalist, former husband of Anne Robinson